Jenni Keenan Green is a Scottish actress.

Background
Born in Paisley, Keenan Green attended the Dance School of Scotland (part of Knightswood Secondary School) in Glasgow to learn ballet. After graduating, she attended the Arts Educational Schools, London

Career
After moving to London, Keenan Green landed her first acting role in 1996 in long-running teen drama Grange Hill. She played Heather Bellshaw in the soap opera River CityFor 6 years. She has also appeared in the television shows Holby City, Monarch of the Glen, Murder Island and Sea of Souls. Movies include “ My life so far , Girl and Tetris . 

In 2004 she was nominated for the post of Rector of the University of Glasgow.

Filmography
Television

Films

References

External links

Scottish television actresses
Scottish soap opera actresses
Living people
Year of birth missing (living people)
Actresses from Paisley, Renfrewshire
People educated at the Arts Educational Schools